Turtle Mountain Community College (TMCC) is a private tribal land-grant community college in Belcourt, North Dakota. It is located ten miles from the Canada–US border in Turtle Mountain, the north central portion of North Dakota. In 2012, TMCC's enrollment was 630 full- and part-time certificate and degree-seeking students.

History
TMCC was founded by the Turtle Mountain Band of Chippewa Indians in 1972. TMCC was chartered to the Turtle Mountain Band of Chippewa Indians in November, 1972. In 1994, the college was designated a land-grant college alongside 31 other tribal colleges.

Campus
The main campus is located just north of the unincorporated city of Belcourt. Belcourt is the center of the reservation community's government, commerce, and education for the more than 31,000 enrolled members of the tribe. The main campus houses a 165,000-square-foot academic building on an approximately 123-acre site. The facility houses technology, finance, general classrooms, science, math and engineering classrooms and labs, library and archives, learning resource centers, faculty area, student services area including a student union, gymnasium, auditorium, career and technical education facility, and mechanical. A wind turbine was erected in 2008 to serve as a source of power to the main campus.

Academics
TMCC offers certification and associate and bachelor's degree programs. TMCC offers a six-year associate degrees in seven subjects as well as four-year bachelor's degrees in elementary and secondary science.

Partnerships
TMCC is a member of the American Indian Higher Education Consortium (AIHEC), which is a community of tribally and federally chartered institutions working to strengthen tribal nations and make a lasting difference in the lives of American Indians and Alaska Natives. TMCC was created in response to the higher education needs of American Indians. TMCC generally serves geographically isolated populations that have no other means of accessing education beyond the high school level.

Athletics
Turtle Mountain competes in the Northern Intercollegiate Athletic Conference and the USCAA. The team nickname is the Mighty Mikinocks. The Athletic Director is Mike Gonzalez. The school fields teams in Men's and Women's basketball.

See also
American Indian College Fund (AICF)

References

External links
 Official website

Community colleges in North Dakota
American Indian Higher Education Consortium
Educational institutions established in 1972
Buildings and structures in Rolette County, North Dakota
Education in Rolette County, North Dakota
1972 establishments in North Dakota
Ojibwe